1944 Olympics  may refer to:

The 1944 Winter Olympics, which were to be held in Cortina d'Ampezzo, Italy, before being cancelled due to World War II
The 1944 Summer Olympics, which were to be held in London, England, before being cancelled due to World War II